Koupéla is a department or commune of Kouritenga Province in eastern Burkina Faso. Its capital is the town of Koupéla. According to the 2019 census the department has a total population of 91,008.

Towns and villages
 Koupéla (49 372 inhabitants) (capital)
 Bik-Baskouré (506 inhabitants) 
 Boangtenga (1 496 inhabitants) 
 Boangtenga-Peulh (78 inhabitants) 
 Bonnessin (1 015 inhabitants) 
 Dianghin (583 inhabitants) 
 Dimpaltenga (322 inhabitants) 
 Dimpaltenga-Peulh (271 inhabitants) 
 Gampougdo-Peulh (127 inhabitants) 
 Gargaoua-Peulh (142 inhabitants) 
 Gninga (1 006 inhabitants) 
 Gorgo (1 972 inhabitants) 
 Kamsaoghin (847 inhabitants) 
 Kanrin (376 inhabitants) 
 Kokemnoré (352 inhabitants) 
 Koudmi (1 148 inhabitants) 
 Koughin (612 inhabitants) 
 Koughin-Peulh (131 inhabitants) 
 Kouritenga (574 inhabitants) 
 Lelguem (366 inhabitants) 
 Liguidi-Malguem (2 059 inhabitants) 
 Nabikessem (282 inhabitants) 
 Naftenga (813 inhabitants) 
 Nayamtenga (1 229 inhabitants) 
 Nohoungo (2 181 inhabitants) 
 Ouédogo (174 inhabitants) 
 Pissalgo (294 inhabitants) 
 Poessin (815 inhabitants) 
 Tarbonnessin (338 inhabitants)  
 Tibin (560 inhabitants) 
 Tiini (245 inhabitants) 
 Tini (1 858 inhabitants) 
 Togtenga (796 inhabitants) 
 Toulougou-Kanrin (701 inhabitants) 
 Toulougou-Nakomsé (252 inhabitants) 
 Toulougou-Yarcé (597 inhabitants) 
 Wédogo-Petit (740 inhabitants) 
 Wedogo-Peulh (88 inhabitants) 
 Zaogo (1 543 inhabitants) 
 Zorkoum (624 inhabitants) 
 Zougo (446 inhabitants)

References

Departments of Burkina Faso
Kouritenga Province
Koupéla